Heinrich Georg Barkhausen (2 December 1881 – 20 February 1956), born in Bremen, was a German physicist.

Growing up in a patrician Bremen family, he showed interest in natural sciences from an early age. He studied at the Technical University of Munich (1901), TU Berlin (1902) and University of Munich (1903) and Berlin before obtaining a doctorate at the University of Göttingen in 1907.

He became professor of electrical engineering at the Technische Hochschule Dresden in 1911 at the age of 29, thus obtaining the world's first chair in this discipline.

In 1919, he discovered the Barkhausen effect (named after him), which provided evidence for the magnetic domain theory of ferromagnetism.     When the magnetic field through a piece of ferromagnetic material like iron is changing, the magnetization of the material changes in a series of tiny discontinuous jumps, which can be heard as a series of clicks in a loudspeaker attached to a coil of wire around the iron.  It was later determined that these jumps were caused by the movement of the magnetic domains in the iron, as the domain walls snap past defects in the crystal lattice.   The energy lost in these dissipative events is responsible for the shape of the hysteresis curve of iron and other ferromagnets.  This effect is widely used in research, and physics education as a simple experiment to demonstrate the reality of magnetic domains.

In 1920, he invented the Barkhausen–Kurz oscillator, with K. Kurz, the first vacuum tube electronic oscillator to use electron transit-time effects. It was the first vacuum tube oscillator that could operate at ultrahigh frequency, up to 300 MHz, and inspired later microwave transit-time tubes such as the klystron.

In 1921 he derived the first mathematical conditions for oscillation in electrical circuits, now called the Barkhausen stability criterion.  They are widely used today in the design of electronic oscillators and general feedback amplifier circuits.

In 1933 Barkhausen signed the Loyalty Oath of German Professors to Adolf Hitler and the National Socialist State.

Publications
Four-volume textbook: Lehrbuch der Elektronenröhren, Elektronenröhren und ihre technischen Anwendungen.

References

External links

 

1881 births
1956 deaths
20th-century German physicists
Technical University of Munich alumni
20th-century German inventors
Members of the German Academy of Sciences at Berlin